is a passenger railway station in the city of Kimitsu, Chiba Prefecture, Japan, operated by the East Japan Railway Company (JR East).

Lines
Kazusa-Kiyokawa Station is a station on the Kururi Line, and is located 4.2 km from the terminus of the line at Kisarazu Station.

Station layout
The station consists of a single side platform serving bidirectional traffic. The platform is short, and can only handle trains with a length of five carriages or less. The station is unattended.

Platform

History
The line was nationalized into the Japanese Government Railways (JGR) on September 1, 1923 at which time the station name was changed to its present name. The JGR became the Japan National Railways (JNR) after World War II. The station was absorbed into the JR East network upon the privatization of the JNR on April 1, 1987. The original station building was destroyed in typhoon in 2004 and replaced with the current structure.

Passenger statistics
In fiscal 2006, the station was used by an average of 254 passengers daily.

Surrounding area
 
 
 Seiwa University

See also
 List of railway stations in Japan

References

External links

   JR East Station information 

Kururi Line
Stations of East Japan Railway Company
Railway stations in Chiba Prefecture
Railway stations in Japan opened in 1912
Kisarazu